Yevgeni Aleksandrovich Kryachik (born 9 September 1969 in Khabarovsk) is a Russian football official and a former player. He is the director with FC Torpedo Armavir.

External links
 
 

1969 births
Footballers from Khabarovsk
Living people
Soviet footballers
Russian footballers
FC Bukovyna Chernivtsi players
Russian expatriate footballers
Expatriate footballers in Ukraine
Russian expatriate sportspeople in Ukraine
Ukrainian Premier League players
FC Kremin Kremenchuk players
FC Metallurg Lipetsk players
FC Lada-Tolyatti players
Russian Premier League players
FC Kuban Krasnodar players
FC Ural Yekaterinburg players
Russian football managers
Association football forwards
FC Neftekhimik Nizhnekamsk players
FC Smena Komsomolsk-na-Amure players